A pony bottle is a small diving cylinder which is fitted with an independent regulator, and carried by a scuba diver as an extension to the scuba set. In an emergency, such as depletion of the diver's main air supply, it can be used as an alternative air source or bailout bottle to allow a normal ascent in place of a controlled emergency swimming ascent.  The key attribute of a pony bottle is that it provides a totally independent and redundant source of breathing gas for the diver. The name pony is due to the smaller size, often of only a few litres capacity.

Pony bottles are used by divers who understand that no matter their preparation and planning, accidents may happen, and cannot, or do not choose to depend on another diver for emergency breathing gas. They are carried by the diver in one of several alternative configurations, and the capacity and contents should be sufficient to allow a safe ascent from any point in the planned dive profile.

Configuration
In a pony bottle system the back-up regulator is a complete diving regulator (first and second stages, and often a submersible pressure gauge) on a separate cylinder which is not intended for use as primary breathing gas during the dive. It provides a totally redundant emergency air supply. The pony bottle is usually smaller than the primary cylinder, but it should provide enough breathing gas to make a totally controlled return to the surface, including any required decompression stop or safety stop along the way. The pony cylinder capacity will depend on the profile for safe ascent to the surface required for a particular dive plan. Popular sizes for a pony bottle include 6, 13 or 19 cu ft in the USA, while 2 litre and 3 litre are common sizes in Europe. For deep or deep technical diving or wreck diving 30 and 40 cu ft (5 litre and 7 litre) cylinders are often used. The pony bottle is a basic requirement for low risk solo diving if the dive is too deep for a safe free ascent, as there is no source of emergency air from a buddy. In scientific diving operations, pony bottles can be standard equipment in tethered scuba diving operations where the diver is often solo but connected to the surface by communications equipment, and an emergency gas supply is mandated.  Several scuba manufacturers produce a minimalist backpack harness that supports a back mounted pony sized bottle exclusively for use in shallow water diving or for boat maintenance purposes.

Options for carrying
There are several options for the mounting of a pony bottle.  The most common way a pony bottle is carried is by fixing it to the side of the primary (back gas) scuba cylinder by straps or clamps, which may include a quick-release system. The most common  alternative is "slinging" it between two D-rings on the diver's scuba harness or buoyancy compensator.
Another possibility is to mount the bottle in a small carrying bag, from which the pony bottle may be easily removed.  This affords the opportunity of "handing off" the entire system to a buddy diver if that buddy needs to share air.  This is a much safer procedure than the buddies having to be connected through use of hosed regulators.  The addition of a pony bottle to the diver's equipment will add an off-balanced weight to the side on which it is mounted.  To compensate for this an equal balancing weight is often added to the tank band on the opposite side of the pony, or in an off-side weight pocket. Attention must also be paid to where the pony bottle second stage regulator is placed during the pre-dive buddy check.

Alternative solutions
The pony bottle is a source of redundancy by providing an alternative source of breathing gas for the diver as an effective backup to his/her primary gas supply in the event of failure of the primary system. The pony bottle is intended for use in "bail out" situations – situations in which the dive must be aborted and safe return to the surface must be facilitated. There are several alternative solutions to providing such a redundant gas supply for bail out purposes which are in common use in diving. These alternatives are listed in the following table along with a critique on how these solutions compare with pony bottle usage as a backup system:

Choice of size

Given that the function of the pony bottle is to provide a source of breathing gas for a controlled and prudent ascent to the surface in an emergency situation, the pony bottle size is chosen to be sufficient for that purpose.  Even when doing no decompression diving, the total reserves of breathing gas should be sufficient to supply three phases of the ascent:
 enough gas to allow for a short period at depth to quickly sort out any problems, if necessary, before returning to the surface
 enough gas to make a safe gradual ascent to safety stop depth and
 enough gas to do a complete safety stop.
  
At the end of this time there should still be sufficient pressure for smooth flow from the regulator.

The table above is constructed to show gas consumed in such a scenario: 2 minutes at depth for "sort-out"; a safe rate of ascent to 5 meters; followed by a 3 minute safety stop. In this particular scenario the 3 litre pony is just sufficient for diving at 20 meters but not 30 meters. A diver selecting a pony bottle would do a similar analysis for his/her own breathing rates, cylinder pressure to be used, and required ascent profile, or take advice in the selection. A submersible pressure gauge is required on the pony bottle regulator so that the pressure can be monitored during use to ensure that the diver surfaces before the gas runs out.

Breathing gas
As shown in the example calculations, the capacity of standard pony bottles make them suitable for use as redundant bail-out devices for conventional recreational diving purposes – i.e. non decompression dives in open water. A general rule of gas usage in this range is that the "bailout gas should match existing breathing gas" so that the switch made between cylinders does not influence calculations for present or future decompression allowances. To maximize safety margins, pony bottles should be filled to their maximum allowable cylinder pressure to provide a maximum reserve for bailout purposes. Often in boats gas refills to these higher limits are not possible, so in these cases the pony can be filled prior to the dive trip excursion. Pony bottles are available with either A-clamp or DIN fitting valves so the appropriate fitting must be available should the pony need to be refilled.

Safety considerations
Testing of pony bottle pressure and regulator function to insure that it is full and ready for use is part of the pre-dive checks. Some divers carry pony bottles mounted in a way that the cylinder valve is easily accessed, and dive with the regulator initially pressurised but with the cylinder valve closed to avoid possible loss of bailout gas due to a free flow. If the pony cylinder valve is in a position where it cannot be reached by the diver, there is a risk that the valve may be left closed with regulator and gauge pressurised and the gas will not be available in an emergency. 

The regulators and the associated SPGs for the pony bottle and primary gas cylinder should be unmistakably different to avoid possible confusion in difficult circumstances (poor visibility or high stress) as mixing up these regulators or gauges can lead to a false ”out of air” emergency. The pony bottle is not generally considered part of the normal gas supply for a dive or to extend a dive by using the pony bottle gas.

Limiting conditions vary with each diver and each profile, so it is necessary to analyze bailout requirements for each specific planned and contingency dive profile, cylinder volume and pressure, diving tables used and realistic assumed breathing rates.

Pony bottles in technical diving

In technical diving, where larger volumes of breathing gas need to be supplied the usefulness of pony bottles greatly diminishes. This type of diving is the province of twinsets, rebreathers or even more complex assemblages. The diver however still needs to consider bailout – an interruption of the planned dive by breathing gas problems that requires a safe exit to the surface.  In certain technical diving equipment configurations the use of larger pony bottles can again come to the fore, particular if the diving is not excessively deep and decompression requirements are modest. An example can be in the case of rebreathers, where the diluent gas supply is also used as a bailout bottle for  rebreather failure.  The capacity of the diluent bottle is very often insufficient for this bailout purpose, and an appropriate larger sized pony can serve as a "backup to the bailout".

References

Underwater breathing apparatus
Underwater diving safety equipment